King Jian of Chu (died 408 BC) was from 431 to 408 BC the king of the state of Chu during the transition from the Spring and Autumn period to the Warring States period.  He was born Xiong Zhong and King Jian was his posthumous title.

King Jian succeeded his father King Hui of Chu, who died in 432 BC.  He reigned for 24 years and was succeeded by his son, King Sheng of Chu.

References

Monarchs of Chu (state)
Chinese kings
5th-century BC Chinese monarchs
408 BC deaths
Year of birth unknown